Baise is a city in Guangxi, China.

Baise may also refer to:

Baïse, river in south-western France
Baise Rajya, a loose confederation of 22 petty kingdoms annexed to Nepal between 1744 and 1810 AD
Festus Baise (born 1980), a Nigerian professional football player
Louis Baise (born 1927), South African Olympic wrestler
Byse, Shimoga, India